The 1977–78 English football season was Aston Villa's 78th in the Football League and their third consecutive season in the top division.

Villa reached the quarter-final of the UEFA Cup where they went out 4–3 on aggregate against Barcelona. In the domestic league, however, they struggled, and Saunders started rebuilding the team.

Diary of the season
17 April 1978: Newcastle United lose at Aston Villa and are relegated to the Second Division.

2 May 1978: Wolverhampton Wanderers beat Aston Villa 3–1 to stay in the First Division at West Ham United's expense.

League table

Squad

References

External links
AVFC History: 1977–78

Aston Villa F.C. seasons
Aston Villa F.C. season